Dmitri Sokolov may refer to:

 Dmitri Sokolov (footballer) (born 1988), Russian footballer with FC Torpedo Moscow and FC Amkar Perm
 Dmitri Sokolov (basketball) (born 1985), Russian basketball player currently with UNICS Kazan
 Dmitri Sokolov (biathlete) (1924–2009), Soviet biathlete
 Dmitri Sokolov (cyclist) (born 1988), Russian racing cyclist
 Dmitri Ivanovich Sokolov (1788–1852), Russian geologist

See also
 Sokolov (surname)